Jože Pahor (20 February 1888 – 1 September 1964) was a Slovene writer, playwright, editor and journalist.

In 1951 he won the Levstik Award for his travel journal around Yugoslavia entitled Hodil po zemlji sem naši (I Walked Our Land).

Bibliography 
 Novels
 Medvladje (Interrimship), 1923
 Serenissima (Serenissima), in the journal Ljubljanski zvon 1928 -1929, as a book in 1945
 Matija Gorjan (Matija Gorjan), 1940
 Pot desetega brata (The Path of the Tenth Brother), 1951

 Plays
 Viničarji (Vineyard Dwellers), 1937, as a book 1951
 Čas je dozorel (The Time Has Come), 1953
 Semena v kamenju (Seeds in Stone), 1954

 Youth literature
 Otrok črnega rodu (A Child of Dark Race), 1937
 Tako je bilo trpljenje (That's What the Suffering Was Like), 1946
 Hodil po zemlji sem naši (I Walked Our Land), 1951
 Mladost na Krasu (Youth on Carst), 1959

References

1888 births
1964 deaths
Slovenian writers
Slovenian editors
Slovenian journalists
Slovenian dramatists and playwrights
Levstik Award laureates
People from Sežana
20th-century dramatists and playwrights
20th-century journalists